Michael Binder (born 14 May 1969) is a retired Austrian football midfielder.

Personal life
Binder's son, Nicolas Binder, followed in his footsteps and is a professional footballer in Austria.

References

1969 births
Living people
Austrian footballers
FC Admira Wacker Mödling players
FC Linz players
Kremser SC players
FK Austria Wien players
SV Würmla players
Floridsdorfer AC players
Wiener Sport-Club players
Association football forwards
Association football midfielders
Austrian Football Bundesliga players
People from Mödling
Footballers from Lower Austria